The enzyme exo-(1→4)-α-D-glucan lyase (α-(1→4)-glucan 1,5-anhydro-D-fructose eliminase, α-1,4-glucan exo-lyase, α-1,4-glucan lyase, GLase) is an enzyme with systematic name (1→4)-α-D-glucan exo-4-lyase (1,5-anhydro-D-fructose-forming). This enzyme catalyses the following chemical reaction

 linear α-glucan = (n-1) 1,5-anhydro-D-fructose + D-glucose

The enzyme catalyses the sequential degradation of (1→4)-α-D-glucans from the non-reducing end.

References

External links 
 

EC 4.2.2